Icarium may refer to:
 Icarium (Attica), a deme of ancient Attica, Greece
 A character in a series of books; see List of Malazan Book of the Fallen characters